Lancelot de Saint-Maard (died 1278) was the fourteenth marshal of France at the time of the Eighth Crusade in 1270.

Eighth Crusade 
Lancelot followed Louis IX to Africa with five knights in that year. He distinguished himself in the assault on Carthage. He conducted the siege and led the charge. During a mêlée, his helm was broken and he was saved by his fellow great officer Imbert de Beaujeu, the constable of France.

1278 deaths
Marshals of France
Christians of the Eighth Crusade
13th-century military history of France

Year of birth unknown